This is a list of international trips made by Atal Bihari Vajpayee during his prime ministership of India.

List

References

Prime ministerial visits
Indian prime ministerial visits
Lists of diplomatic visits by heads of state
Diplomatic visits by heads of government